The Kaluli  are a clan of indigenous peoples who live in the rain forests of the Great Papuan Plateau in Papua New Guinea. The Kaluli, who numbered approximately 2,000 people in 1987, are the most numerous and well documented by post-contact ethnographers and missionaries among the four language-clans of Bosavi kalu ("men or people of Bosavi") that speak non-Austronesian languages. Their numbers are thought to have declined precipitously following post-contact disease epidemics in the 1940s, and have not rebounded due to high infant mortality rates and periodic influenza outbreaks. The Kaluli are mostly monolingual in an ergative language.

Demographics 
The Kaluli are an indigenous tribe in Papua New Guinea. The origin of the name with the addition of the suffix -li the word Kaluli directly translates to “real people of Bosavi.” The Kaluli has a population of 2,000 to 12,000 people that reside in the tropical rainforest in the Southern Highlands Province of Papua New Guinea, on the Great Papuan Plateau near Mt. Bosavi. They live in 20 longhouse communities, which are more than land, but the clan's identity. “It is used much like a name in friendly socializing; in war, these place names serve other purposes. Enemies on the attack were on unfamiliar turf, with no knowledge, of which ridges and trails might be well-suited for a defender to hide behind in ambush.” Longhouses are used to demonstrate their connection to their land, which is a big part of their culture.

The first group of Europeans traveled to Papua New Guinea in 1934, bringing trade goods such as knives, mirrors, beads, and pearl shells. During World War II European contact was broken until the 1950s. Between 1950 and 1964 contact was infrequent. During the period of broken connection, a form of measles and influenza struck the area the Kaluli lived, and a lack of natural resistances and access to European technologies led to decreases in the Kaluli population. An ongoing threat regardless of public health programs, infant mortality and influenza epidemics sweeps the lowlands.

Settlements 
The Kaluli live in longhouses, about 20 in number, which operate as autonomous communities. Each longhouse houses approximately 15 families, numbering approximately 60 to 90 people per longhouse, that each divide into two or three patrilineal lineages. Many families have begun to live mainly in smaller separate dwellings for two or more extended families, while still maintaining their communal longhouse (circa 1984). They are a highly egalitarian people without a hierarchical authority or ranked social structure.  They are swidden agriculturalists whose food staple is the sago. They maintain extensive gardens while also pursuing hunting and fishing. Their diet is supplemented by garden cultivated banana, pandanus, breadfruit and green vegetables, as well as fish, small game, wild pig and occasionally domestic pig. Kaluli people also believe that male initiation must be properly done by ritually delivering the semen of an elderly member through the initiate's anus.

The Kaluli tribe live in a patrilocal village, meaning that the men are the head of the tribe and belong to lineages of patrilineal clans. The Kaluli tribe live in separate communities, which have 15 families and around 60 people, who reside in a longhouse that creates the feeling of community. They build houses, garden, hunt, fish, sing and cook together, and are very close-knit community. Each community makes one longhouse centered, and several smaller homes surrounding it in a clearing. A longhouse is a primary residence where all the families in the community reside. More modest homes are similar to garden houses and temporary homes for the wives during harvest time. Large longhouses were built with the dimensions around 60 feet by 30 feet, with porches on both ends, made five feet to twelve feet off the ground. Along with the people, longhouses are inhabited by pigs, which are used as “watchdogs” because they make noises at strangers. The interior of a longhouse is not separated by gender whereas the women, children, and piglets are not co-signed to a specific space, they sleep in the passageways down the sides. “Fireboxes are used for smaller, solitary meals or “snacks,” but the longhouse functions as much as a town hall as it does a residence.”  The longhouse is where they have community meetings, meals, and more indoor activities as a community that does not take place outside. When a member of the longhouse is married, their "roommates" contribute to the bride price. After two to three years, the longhouse decomposes, and the residents move and build another community in another area.

Language and development 

Everyday life of the Kaluli people has been characterized by ethnolinguists as overtly centered on verbal interaction (in comparison to middle-class Anglo cultures). Spoken language is used as the primary explicit method of communicating desires, expression of thought, control and appeal. It is therefore the primary index of cultural competence. This is especially expressed in the socialization, or child-raising process, of infants to adults. For instance, when an infant first uses the words for "mother" and "breast", the behaviors oriented toward that child change: beforehand, a child is not considered to be capable of having specific intentions, whereas after this competence milestone the process of "teaching [the child] how to talk" begins, and thus talk begins to be directed directly at the child. This does not exist in middle-class Anglo cultures, where infants are addressed somewhat like intentioned competent individuals from birth through the use of baby-talk, which saliently does not exist in Kaluli culture. For this reason, the Kaluli language has been one of the languages invoked to describe the difficulty of meta-pragmatic-analysis in linguistics—in that many ethnographers, linguists, and anthropologists are biased towards their own culture—and to lobby for a more comparative approach.

Politics

Organization 
Politics in the Kaluli society is highly egalitarian, both politically and economically. However, they do not have any formal positions of leadership, for example, there is no “Big Man” in the community. There is also not an official system of control; the methods of informal sanction are through the wealthy and elders. Wealth is considered by if one owns a longhouse, food, and amount of trade goods. Crimes are only rarely committed; the usual causes of conflicts among the Kaluli are theft and death. The members that have the most power and political weight are the wealthy members, similar to other highland groups.

Trade and Labor 
The Kaluli trade with both other tribes and in their community, which revolves primarily around life-cycle and political activity. Long-standing trade with people in the north, and recently established in the east, different regions of Papua New Guinea provide different goods. The main trade goods are manufacture tools for gardening, stone adzes, bows, and net bags; the forest provides all other needs or goods needed or created by themselves. From the west came hornbill beaks and strings of dog's teeth, the south brought tree oil. Their main trade partners were the  Huli in the highlands, which provided salt, tobacco, and aprons from woven net. "The forest provides materials for constructing longhouses and fences...most elaborate items of manufacture are the extravagant costumes for ceremonial occasions."

Labor and socialization are cooperative, where the men and women complement each other. The women look after the pigs, take care of the pigs, and hunt small forest game. They are in charge of cooking and starching. Most importantly the women are in charge of socializing with the children. The men do all labor activities as a group. The male relationships are based on reciprocity and obligation in order to accomplish demanding tasks, such as hunt large forest game, cutting down trees, clearing plots for the gardens, and building dams and fences.

Social organization

Kinship 
Bambi Schieffelin's ethnography studies the language of socialization as its goal is to understand how people become competent members of their social groups and the role of language in the process. Two significant areas of socialization are the use of communication and socialization through language. The method of acquiring a language is affected by one's role in society. Socialization is an interactive process between knowledgeable members and novices. Kaluli family interactions are very repetitive and predictable in everyday life. The connection between children and elders is the representation of revisions of children's ideas about their abilities.

Marriage 
The Kalui is an exogamous group, which means they marry outside of their specific community. They are patrilineal clans; each longhouse/community have two or more lineages or clans. Even though they are a patrilineal clan, each claims ties to both the mother's and father's sides. Paternal kin provides the relationship between longhouses across tribes, while the maternal kin offers relations between individuals to relatives, but only intimately connected to one side of the family. An individual's connection is to whom they feel the closest to (i.e., ones they've grown up with, lived with, or see the most); the closer the connection, the more they share food and gardens. Relationships between villages maintain by ties of marriage with a matrilineal affiliation. The Kaluli prefer to marry others from a different clan because they are unfamiliar with them. Marriage is not something that is a free choice; it is arranged. The elders instigate the binding ritual without the bride or the groom knowing. Marriage is a lifelong exchange with a gift or bridewealth and brings food and hospitality across clans.

The giving and sharing of food 

The Kaluli are intimate with their land, giving unique names to their trees, rivers, and streams. They also practice swidden horticulture in extensive gardens and have a rich and varied diet. It is imperative for them to connect to the environment around them. Their daily protein consists of fish, crayfish, rodents, and lizards. Fish are in abundance, and a small number of pigs are domesticated; however, their dependence on forest foods contributes to their low population density. Other than protein, most of their food comes from trees and plants, especially grain and vegetables. Daily activities, labor, and socialization are complementary between genders: women tend gardens, look after pigs, hunt small game and gather other small protein sources, and process starch and sago.

The central theme of Kaluli culture is the fundamental element of interpersonal relationships. Food is key to making this element work; it is a primary way of relating to children and showing affection. Sharing food is an expected norm. The hospitality of giving food is different from sharing between friends; the type of food they bring to their friends depends on how close they are to them. The Kaluli automatically offer food to relatives visiting from other longhouses; if hospitality is not provided to the family, they would be in “social limbo.” The quality of hospitality increases on ceremonial occasions, when longhouses host other longhouses. “The social distance maintained between host and guests allows the gift of food to be a public demonstration of food faith in the relationship.” As a formal statement of commitment to a friendship, hosts are not allowed to eat during the occasion; they only present the food, sit separately, and watch the guests eat. Beyond ceremonial occasions, two Kaluli can express special affection for each other by sharing a meal of meat, and then calling each other the name of the food they shared. For example, if a pair shared a bandicoot they would call each other “my bandicoot,” thereby showing their close relationship.

Religion

The Unseen World 
"All that cannot be seen is a very real part of Kaluli life. The forest is thick and hides many things from the eyes, but is full of sound." The Kaluli believe in spirits in the forest and animals. The Kaluli do not wake to the rising of the sun but to the screech of a bird. They pay attention to the mournful call of a pigeon which symbolizes a little child calling for its mother. People that are unseen are either a “shadow” or “reflection”; if the shadow dies or is killed the Kaluli counterpart does also. Spirits of the dead also live in the unseen world, along with spirits that never took a human body. Reciprocal spirits take place in wild pigs and cassowaries. They do not believe that the dead bring ill will to the living.

See also

 Kaluli creation myth
Mount Bosavi
 LGBT rights in Papua New Guinea

References

Indigenous peoples of Melanesia
Ethnic groups in Papua New Guinea